Matthew Hetherton (1951 – 6 April 2021) was an Irish Gaelic footballer who played for club sides Munterconnaught and St Mary's and at senior level for the Cavan county team.

Career
Hetherton began his Gaelic football career at club level with Munterconnaught. He had his most successful season in 1976 when the club claimed the County Junior Championship title. Within the space of two weeks, Hetherton had also won a County Senior Championship title with a St. Mary's amalgamation and was also named man of the match in the final. By this stage he had also been drafted onto the Cavan senior football team, making his debut during the National League in 1975. Hetherton maintained his place in the panel for three years.

Death
Hetherton had been in poor health for some time and died at St Francis Hospice in Blanchardstown on 6 April 2021.

Honours
Munterconnaught
Cavan Junior Football Championship: 1976

St Mary's
Cavan Senior Football Championship: 1976

References

1951 births
2021 deaths
Cavan inter-county Gaelic footballers